Eclipse (2004) is an original novel written by James Swallow and based on the long-running British science fiction comic strip Judge Dredd. It is Swallow's first Judge Dredd novel.

Synopsis
Judge Dredd must quell a riot on the Luna-1 colony on the Moon.

External links
Eclipse at the 2000 AD website.

Novels by James Swallow
Judge Dredd novels